The Singapore Hotel and Tourism Education Centre (SHATEC) was set up in 1983 by the Singapore Hotel Association to equip Singapore's hospitality industry with a skilled workforce.

Location 
SHATEC's main campus is located at 21, Bukit Batok Street 22, Singapore.

Its student-run eatery is located at Enabling Village.

Schools and departments 
 Institute of Lodging, Tourism and Business Studies
 Institute of Food and Beverage
 Institute of Culinary Arts

Notable alumni 

 Pierre Png, actor
 Ben Yeo, actor and host.

References 

Hospitality schools in Singapore
Tourism in Singapore